The All-Russian Congress of Soviets evolved from 1917 to become the supreme governing body of the Russian Soviet Federative Socialist Republic from 1918 until 1936, effectively. The 1918 Constitution of the Russian SFSR mandated that Congress shall convene at least twice a year, with the duties of defining (and amending) the principles of the Soviet Constitution and ratifying peace treaties. The October Revolution ousted the provisional government of 1917, making the Congress of Soviets the sole, and supreme governing body. It is important to note that this Congress was not the same as the Congress of Soviets of the Soviet Union which governed the whole Soviet Union after its creation in 1922.

For the earlier portion of its life, the Congress was a democratic body. Over Russia there were hundreds of soviets, democratic local governing bodies in which the surrounding population could participate. The soviets elected the delegates to the Congress, and then in turn the Congress held the national authority, making the highest decisions. There were several political parties represented in the various sessions of the Congress, each of which fought for increasing their own influence in the soviets. However, as the civil war progressed, the soviets' authority was progressively reduced, with the rise of Stalinism effectively cementing this situation and decisively turning the Congress into a rubber stamp. The Congress was formed of representatives of city councils (1 delegate per 25,000 voters) and the congresses of the provincial (oblast) and autonomous republican councils (1 deputy for every 125,000 inhabitants).

The exclusive jurisdiction of the Congress consisted of the election of the All-Russian Central Executive Committee, adoption of the Constitution of the Russian SFSR and amendments to it, approval of amendments proposed by the Central Executive Committee, and approval of the autonomous republics' constitutions. On the other issues, the Congress and the Central Executive Committee had the same authority. The Congress ceased to exist at the end of the constitutional reform of 1936–1937, when first on the union and then at the republican levels indirect election to Soviets were replaced by direct elections at all levels with the Supreme Soviet as the highest legislative body.

History

Origin of Soviets

The first soviets appeared during the 1905 Russian Revolution as councils (soviets) of workers in those cities that were captured by mass strikes (strike action). Enterprises that were participating in those strikes had delegated to those councils their delegates to coordinate joint actions. In various locations those councils carried different names such as "Soviet of workers deputies", "Delegate assembly", "Assembly of deputies", "Commission of elected", and others. By October 1905 the "Soviet of workers deputies" became more common. Following the example of Soviets of workers deputies in other locations were appearing Soviets of workers, sailors, and soldiers deputies, Soviets of workers and peasants deputies, Soviet of peasants deputies.

Originally, those soviets were mass political organizations.

For socialist parties the appearance of soviets was unexpected, yet each made an effort to delegate to them their representatives. Mensheviks and SRs view those soviets as strike committees or local authorities of self-government. Bolsheviks have seen in them the authority with help of which they could install in the country their dictatorship. In 1905 Vladimir Lenin noted that in political relations the Soviet of workers deputies should be viewed as the kernel (germ) of provisional revolutionary government.

In 1917 Vladimir Lenin in his April theses came up with the famous slogan "All power to the Soviets!". Following the February Revolution, Lenin considered that in Russia dual power existed as an interweaving of bourgeoisie power (Provisional Government) and the powers of the revolutionary masses (soviets). All other Russian political parties considered soviets as temporary public organizations and dual power did not exist for them as they were preparing for elections to the All-Russian Constituent Assembly.

Embedment of Bolsheviks into the Soviets (Bolshevization of the Soviets) established the Communist-Soviet system of state power in the USSR which existed until the 1988 constitutional reform. It was a political regime that have joined in itself the dictatorship of the communist party and power of soviets (councils). Mechanism of such combination was theoretically designed by Vladimir Lenin and placed into practice by Bolshevik party. In communist-soviet system of power, the dictatorship of party (professional revolutionaries) was concealed by popular sovereignty (people's rule) of the soviets and therefore officially the political regime has been called the Soviet power.

Main meetings

Conference
Following the February Revolution, on 11–16 April 1917 in Petrograd the All-Russian conference of Soviets of workers and soldiers deputies was held.

At the conference, 480 delegates out of 139 Soviets, 13 military rear area garrisons, 7 of regular army, and 26 separate frontline councils attended.

On the agenda were 
 attitude towards the War
 attitude towards the Russian Provisional Government
 organizational issues
 organization of revolutionary forces
 preparation to the Russian Constituent Assembly
 food issue
 land issue
 issues of peasants' life
 workers' issues
 others

Majority was composed of Mensheviks and SRs. The Bolshevik group introduced its own resolution drafts on key issues of agenda.

In its resolution on war that was rather defensive, presented by Menshevik-SR Petrograd Soviet Executive Committee, the conference approved the declaration of the Provisional Government about the war (of 28 March) as if it abandoned aggressive goals. The Bolshevik group, on behalf of which Lev Kamenev had been speaking, took "a wrong position" by taking off own resolution draft and voting for the Menshevik-SR resolution after it was added with resolutions about "control and impact" of revolutionary democracy on the Provisional Government and its local authorities. Recognizing the need for a legislative establishment of 8 hour workday, the conference did not call the workers upon its immediate establishment by revolutionary means. On peasant and land issues, the conference adopted its resolution about support in the Constituent Assembly for gratuitous alienation from all privately owned lands and transferring them to working people, but spoke against "arbitrary resolution of land issue at local level", leaving, thus, the land in hands of landowners.

On 16 April 1917 the conference elected 10 delegates from oblasts and 6 from the Army and the Navy to the Petrograd Soviet Executive Committee turning it in this way in central authority of Soviets of the whole country until the opening of First All-Russian Congress of Soviets of workers and soldiers deputies. On 17 April 1917, Vladimir Lenin made a report about war and revolution in which he outlined his April theses to that conference. The same day he repeated his report at a joint conference of Bolsheviks and Mensheviks who took part.

First Congress

The First All-Russian Congress of Soviets of Workers 'and Soldiers' Deputies (June 16 – July 7, 1917) was convened by the National Conference of the Soviets. It was dominated by pro-government parties (Socialist-Revolutionaries, etc.) and confirmed the supremacy of the Russian Provisional Government.

There were 1090 delegates, 822 acting as voting delegates, representing 305 workers', soldiers' and peasant soviets, and 53 regional, provincial and district soviets. The breakdown of delegates by party was thus: 285 Socialist-Revolutionaries, 248 Mensheviks, 105 Bolsheviks, 32 Menshevik Internationalists, and others. The right to vote was given to these soviets containing at least 25,000 persons, and each representative from 10,000 to 25,000 members was asked to speak on behalf of the Soviet of his locality or employment.

Second Congress

Following the overthrow of the Provisional Government of Russia in the October Revolution, the Second All-Russian Congress of Soviets of Workers' and Soldiers' Deputies (November 7–9, 1917) ratified the revolutionary transfer of state power. 649 delegates were elected to the Congress, representing 318 local soviets; 390 were Bolsheviks, about 100 left SRs, about 60 other SRs, 72 Mensheviks, 14 United Socialist Democrat-Internationalists, 6 Menshevik Internationalists and 7 of other factions. On the first day of the Congress, the Socialist Revolutionaries split into two groups – the Left Social Revolutionaries and the Right Social Revolutionaries. Also on the first day, the Menshevik delegation and Right Socialist Revolutionary deputies walked out in protest. 505 delegates voted in favour of the transfer of power to the Soviets. The All-Russian Central Executive Committee and Council of People's Commissars was elected by the Congress, naming Vladimir Lenin the Chairman, and thus making him the head of government. At the opening of the Congress, Lenin gave a speech saying that the "Soviet government will propose an immediate democratic peace to all the nations and an immediate armistice on all fronts" and declared "Long live the revolution!," uttering what are sometimes called the "Land Decree" and "Decree on Peace."

Third Congress

The Third All-Russian Congress of Soviets of Workers', Soldiers' and Peasants' Deputies (January 23–31, 1918) was attended by delegates from 317 Soviets of Workers', Soldiers' and Peasants' with a further 110 delegates from army, corps and divisional committees.  The Bolsheviks comprised 441 of the 707 delegates. On the fourth day January 13 (26), more delegates who had been at the Third All-Russia Congress of Soviets of Peasants' Deputies arrived. By the end there were 1,587 delegates.

The Congress had a Presidium composed of ten Bolsheviks and three Left Socialist-Revolutionaries with a further delegate from each other group (Right Socialist-Revolutionaries, Mensheviks, etc.).

The Swiss, Romanian, Swedish and Norwegian Social-Democratic parties, the British Socialist Party and the Socialist Party of America sent messages of solidarity.

Occurring shortly after the Constituent Assembly had been dissolved by order of the All-Russian Central Executive Committee (VTsIK), the Congress resolved to expunge any references to the forthcoming Constituent Assembly from all new editions of decrees and laws of the Soviet Government.
The Congress received:
 Yakov Sverdlov's report on the activity of the All-Russian Central Executive Committee.
 Vladimir Lenin's report on the activity of the Council of People's Commissars.
 Joseph Stalin's report from the People's Commissariat of Nationalities on the principles of federation and the nationalities' policy for the emerging Soviet state. The nationalities policy was agreed.

The Mensheviks, Right Socialist-Revolutionaries and the Menshevik internationalists used the Congress to indicate their opposition to the domestic and foreign policy which the Bolsheviks passed.

The Declaration of Rights of the Working and Exploited People was passed and this went on to become the basis of the Soviet Constitution. It was also agreed to establish the Russian Soviet Federative Socialist Republic on the basis of a free union of the peoples of Russia.

The Congress also approved the Decree on Land which provided the basic provisions of the redistribution and nationalization of land.

Fourth Congress
At the Fourth Extraordinary All-Russian Congress of Soviets (March 14–16, 1918), the Treaty of Brest-Litovsk was ratified. This marked a rift between the Bolsheviks and the Left Socialist Revolutionaries, who voted against the treaty and whose ministers quit the Sovnarkom in protest.

Fifth Congress
The Fifth All-Russian Congress of Soviets of Workers’ Peasants’, Soldiers’ and Red Army Deputies was held July 4–10, 1918. A  decree that "linked citizenship to military service and obliged all healthy men aged 18–40 years to come forward" and fight for the Red Army in the Russian Civil War was passed.

The Left Socialist-Revolutionaries had 352 delegates compared to 745 Bolsheviks out of 1132 total. The Left SRs raised disagreements on the suppression of rival parties, the death penalty, and mainly, the Treaty of Brest-Litovsk. The Left SR Uprising broke out on during this Congress. Its suppression marked the end of Left SR participation in the Congress of Soviet.

Sixth Congress
The Sixth Extraordinary All-Russian Congress of Soviets of Workers’, Peasants’, Cossacks’ and Red Army Deputies was held November 6–9, 1918.

Seventh Congress
The Seventh All-Russian Congress of Soviets of Workers’, Peasants’, Cossacks’ and Red Army Deputies was held December 5–9, 1919. That year a report on the foreign policy of Soviet Russia was submitted to the Congress and Leon Trotsky read a report on Soviet military construction and fronts in the Russian Civil War.

Eighth Congress
Officially called the Eighth All-Russian Congress of Soviets of Workers’, Peasants’, Red Army and Cossack Deputies was held in Moscow on December 22–29, 1920. It was at this Congress that Gleb Krzhizhanovsky presented his report on the GOELRO plan. This was the first economic plan which focused on significant electrification of Russian industry. Lenin criticised Trotsky's pamphlet, The Role and Tasks of the Trade Unions at the subsequent preliminary joint meeting of Bolshevik delegates. The Congress also established the Sowing Committee (posevkomy).

Ninth Congress

The Ninth All-Russian Congress of Soviets was held in Moscow from December 23–28, 1921. It was attended by 1,991 delegates, of whom 1,630 held voting status.

Tenth Congress

The Tenth All-Russian Congress of Soviets was held in Moscow from December 23–27, 1922. It was attended by 1,727 delegates and 488 guests. At this Congress, 488 were from the Bolshevik-controlled states of the Ukraine, Belorussia and Transcaucasia and Joseph Stalin announced the union of the Russian Soviet Federated Socialist Republic, Ukrainian Soviet Socialist Republic, Belorussian Soviet Socialist Republic, and the Transcaucasian Soviet Federated Socialist Republic into the Soviet Union, endorsed by the Congress. In his speech before the Congress, Stalin, as final words, said that: "Let us hope, comrades, that by forming our Union Republic we shall create a reliable bulwark against international capitalism, and that the new Union State will be another decisive step towards the union of the working people of the whole world into a World Soviet Socialist Republic."

Eleventh Congress

The Eleventh All-Russian Congress of Soviets was held in Moscow from January 19–29, 1924. It was attended by 1,637 delegates, of whom 1,143 held voting status.

Twelfth Congress

The Twelfth All-Russian Congress of Soviets was held in Moscow from May 7–16, 1925. It was attended by 1,634 delegates, of whom 1,084 held voting rights.

See also
 Congress of Soviets, general article for congresses of all soviet republics

References

 
Government of the Soviet Union
Historical legislatures
Russian Soviet Federative Socialist Republic
1917 establishments in Russia
1938 disestablishments in the Soviet Union
Russian Revolution
Supreme Soviet of Russia